Emmanuel Presbyterian Church (Unity Church of the Nazarene) is a historic church at 419 Mesa Road in Colorado Springs, Colorado. It was built in 1903 and was added to the National Register in 1984. The Emmanuel Presbyterian Church is significant as one of the few remaining examples of vernacular ecclesiastical architecture of landmark proportions in Colorado Springs.

References

Presbyterian churches in Colorado
Churches on the National Register of Historic Places in Colorado
Churches completed in 1903
Churches in Colorado Springs, Colorado
National Register of Historic Places in Colorado Springs, Colorado
1903 establishments in Colorado
Churches in El Paso County, Colorado
Churches in Colorado